The Municipality of Sveti Andraž v Slovenskih Goricah is a small municipality in northeastern Slovenia. It lies in the Slovene Hills. The administrative centre of the municipality is the village of Vitomarci. The area is part of the traditional region of Styria. The municipality is now included in the Drava Statistical Region.

Until 1995 it was part of the Municipality of Ptuj and was then included in the Municipality of Destrnik–Trnovska Vas. It became an independent municipality in 1998.

Settlements
The municipality includes the following settlements:
 Drbetinci
 Gibina
 Hvaletinci
 Novinci
 Rjavci
 Slavšina
 Vitomarci

References

External links

Sveti Andraž v Slovenskih Goricah Municipality at Geopedia
Sveti Andraž v Slovenskih Goricah municipal website

 
Sveti Andraz v Slovenskih Goricah